Stf0 sulfotransferases are essential for the biosynthesis of sulfolipid-1 in prokaryotes. They adopt a structure that belongs to the sulfotransferase superfamily, consisting of a single domain with a core four-stranded parallel beta-sheet flanked by alpha-helices.

References

EC 2.8.2
Protein families